Leodamas of Thasos (c. 380 BC) was a Greek mathematician and a contemporary of Plato, about whom little is known.

There are two references to Leodamas in Proclus's Commentary on Euclid:

At this time [Plato's time] also lived Leodamas of Thasos, Archytas of Tarentum, and Theaetetus of Athens, by whom the theorems [of geometry] were increased in number and brought into a more scientific arrangement.  Younger than Leodamas was Neoclides and his pupil Leon, who added many discoveries.

Plato, it is said, taught this method [analysis] to Leodamas, who is also reported to have made many discoveries in geometry by means of it.

and one in Diogenes Laërtius' Lives and Opinions of Eminent Philosophers, Book 3 (Plato):

He [Plato] was the first to explain to Leodamas of Thasos the method of solving problems by analysis.

Notes 

5th-century BC births
4th-century BC deaths
4th-century BC Greek people
Ancient Greek mathematicians
Ancient Thasians
4th-century BC mathematicians